Muhsin "Moose" Muhammad III is an American football wide receiver for the Texas A&M Aggies.

High school career
Muhammad III attended Myers Park High School in Charlotte, North Carolina. He was selected to the 2020 All-American Bowl. Muhammad III committed to Texas A&M University to play college football.

College career
Muhammad III played in three games his first at Texas A&M in 2020, and did not record a reception. He played in eight games in 2021 and had 10 receptions for 153 yards and four touchdowns. In 2022, he became a starter and finished the year with 38 receptions for 610 yards and four touchdowns.

Personal life
His father, Muhsin Muhammad, played in the NFL.

References

External links
Texas A&M Aggies bio

Living people
Players of American football from North Carolina
American football wide receivers
Texas A&M Aggies football players
Year of birth missing (living people)